Carolina Cousins is a studio album by American country music artist Dottie West. It was released in May 1975 on RCA Victor Records and was produced by Billy Davis. Carolina Cousins was West's 24th studio recording and contained a total of ten tracks. It would be her final album release with the RCA label before moving to United Artists Records in 1976. The album contained one single, "Rollin' in Your Sweet Sunshine," which became a minor hit in 1975.

Background and content
Carolina Cousins was recorded at the RCA Studio in Nashville, Tennessee. The sessions were produced by Billy Davis. It was West's third production collaboration with Davis, who had also written her 1973 hit "Country Sunshine". The album's ten tracks contained a variety of musical stylings. Liner notes writer, Bill Becker, called the album's style "a musical trip, literally and figuratively." Four of the album's songs were penned by West herself. This included a re-recording of "Country Sunshine" and "I'm Your Country Girl". Also included was a cover of John Denver's pop hit "Back Home Again." The album also included a variety of songwriters, such as Barbara Fairchild, who wrote the track "This Stranger, My Little Girl".  The album's cover photo featured West posing with a Coca Cola, a nod to the "Country Sunshine"'s origins as a jingle for a 1972 Coke commercial.

Release and chart performance
Carolina Cousins was released in May 1975 on RCA Victor Records. It was West's 24th studio album and her final for the RCA label. It was offered as a vinyl LP, containing five songs on each side of the record. The album made the Billboard Top Country Albums chart. It spent two weeks on the chart and peaked at number 45 in June 1975. "Rollin' in Your Sweet Sunshine" was the only single included on the album. It was first issued as a single in March 1975. Spending ten weeks on the Billboard Hot Country Singles chart, it only reached number 68 by July 1975.

Track listing

Personnel
All credits are adapted from the liner notes of Carolina Cousins.

Musical personnel
 Bucky Barrett – guitar
 The Jordanaires – background vocals
 Mike Leech – bass
 Terry McMillian – harmonica
 Byron Metcalf – drums
 Weldon Myrick – dobro
 The Nashville Edition – background vocals
 Kenny O'Dell – guitar
 Ron Oates – keyboards
 Dale Sellers – guitar
 Buddy Spicher – violin
 Henry Strzelecki – bass
 Bobby Thompson – guitar
 Dottie West – lead vocals

Technical personnel
 Bill Backer – liner notes
 Billy Davis – producer
 Byron Metcalf – percussion
 D. Bergen White – string arrangement

Chart performance

Release history

References

1975 albums
Dottie West albums
RCA Records albums